Gospel Communications International (formerly Gospel Films) was a non-profit Christian organization and the founder and parent organization of several Christian websites based in Muskegon, Michigan.

Gospel Communications Network was founded in 1995 in partnership with nine other ministries (Keys for Kids Ministries, International Bible Society, InterVarsity Christian Fellowship, InterVarsity Press, Ligonier Ministries, The Navigators, RBC Ministries, Youth for Christ, Youth Specialties).

The most notable ministry is the Bible Gateway, an online Bible in several translations and languages, which was acquired by Zondervan in 2007.

In September 2008, Gospel Communications announced it would cease operations on December 15, 2008.

References

External links
 Gospel Communications International

Christian mass media companies
1995 establishments in Michigan
Muskegon, Michigan
Companies established in 1995